The 42nd Annual Annie Awards honoring excellence in the field of animation of 2014 was held on January 31, 2015, at the University of California, Los Angeles's Royce Hall in Los Angeles, California, presenting in 36 categories. This year, a new category called Best Character Animation in a Video Game was added.

Production nominees
On December 1, 2014, the nominations for Annie Awards were announced. The Boxtrolls earned the most nominations with 13 nominations, followed by How to Train Your Dragon 2 with 10 nominations. Big Hero 6 and Song of the Sea received 7 nominations each.

Individual achievement categories

Juried awards

Dates and deadlines

References

External links
 Complete list of 42nd Annual Annie Awards nominees and winners

 Annie Awards 2015 at Internet Movie Database

2014
2014 film awards
Annie
Annie